Jerry Martin is an American composer, best known for his work composing music (particularly jazz) for television commercials, and being the lead composer for several games in The Sims franchise, including SimCity 3000, The Sims, The Sims Bustin' Out, The Sims 2 and SimCity 4. He made a return in 2020 with SimCasino.

Early life and education
Martin began taking music lessons at the age of 10 and played guitar and keyboards in various ensembles through his high school and college education. Martin received his Bachelor of Arts degree in music composition from California State University, Hayward and a Master of Fine Arts from the Center for Contemporary Music at Mills College.

Career 
In 1985, he founded his original music composition and production company called "Musicontrol". From 1985 to 1995, Martin composed and produced music for various projects such as video soundtracks to national TV and radio commercials, working with over 90 individual film, video and ad agency producers on over 200 different commissions from companies such as AT&T, Toyota, the NBA, Honda, and others. In 1996, Martin joined the Maxis division of Electronic Arts as studio audio director and Lead Composer. From 1996 through 2004, he composed and produced music and directed the audio for multi-platinum video game franchises such as The Sims and SimCity.

In 2005, Martin started his new company, Jerry Martin Music, and is currently working on various professional and personal musical projects.

Works

Video game soundtracks 

 The Sims
 The Sims Livin' Large
 The Sims House Party
 The Sims Hot Date
 The Sims Vacation
 The Sims Unleashed
 The Sims Superstar
 The Sims Makin' Magic
 The Sims Bustin' Out
 The Sims Online
 The Sims 2
 SimCity 3000
 SimCity 3000 Unlimited
 SimCity 4
 SimCity 4 Rush Hour
 SimCopter

 SimTunes
 SimPark
 SimSafari
 SimGolf
 Streets of SimCity
 Supercross 2000
 Tony La Russa Baseball
 SimCasino

Companies whose TV commercials feature Martin's compositions 

AT&T Communications
Acer Corporation
Alamo Car Rental
Apple
Avocet
Buick Dealers Association
Cost Plus Imports
Electronic Arts
Emporium
GMC Trucks Dealers Association
Gallo Salame
Grass Valley Group
Growing Healthy Inc.
Hilltop Shopping Center
Hitachi Data Systems
Honda Dealers Association
KTVU Channel 2
Landor Associates
Longs Drug Stores
Lucky Stores
NBA
Nationwide Marketing
Olympic Stain
Pacific Bell
Philip Morris
Primerica
Project Open Hand
RSCVA
Raychem Corporation
Quantum
Rolm
Safeway Eastern Division
Sierra Pacific Power
Southern Pacific
Sun Microsystems
SYVA
Suzuki USA
Toyota
Toyota USA
Toyota Dealers Association
Weinstock's
Wells Fargo Bank
Wesson Oil
Yamaha USA

References

External links 
Jerry Martin's official site
Composer profile at OverClocked ReMix

Year of birth missing (living people)
Living people
American jazz composers
Electronic Arts employees
American male jazz composers
California State University, East Bay alumni
Maxis
Video game composers